The Fountain of Madness is a 1921 German silent film directed by Ottmar Ostermayr and starring Georg Henrich, Sadjah Gezza and Genée Schindler.

It was shot at the Emelka Studios in Munich. The film's sets were designed by the art director Carl Ludwig Kirmse.

Cast
 Georg Henrich as Adoo - Kunstsammler
 Sadjah Gezza as Beari - Oberpriesterin
 Genée Schindler as Bearis Lieblingspriesterin
 Carl Dalmonico as Oberpriester
 Carl Sickas Bildhauer

References

Bibliography
 Bock, Hans-Michael & Bergfelder, Tim. The Concise CineGraph. Encyclopedia of German Cinema. Berghahn Books, 2009.
 Sylvia Wolf, Ulrich Kurowski, Eberhard Hauff. Das Münchener Film und Kino Buch. Edition Achteinhalb Lothar Just, 1988.

External links

1921 films
Films of the Weimar Republic
German silent feature films
Films directed by Ottmar Ostermayr
German black-and-white films
Bavaria Film films
Films shot at Bavaria Studios
1920s German films